The Dai Hong Dan incident took place on 29October 2007, when the North Korean cargo vessel MV Dai Hong Dan was attacked and temporarily seized by Somali pirates off Somalia. The following day, the crew of the vessel overpowered the pirates with the support of a U.S. naval vessel.

Seizure 
A group of Somali pirates boarded and captured the North Korean cargo ship Dai Hong Dan. According to North Korean sources, the ship had unloaded its cargo in the Somali capital when seven armed pirates (disguised as guards) boarded the ship, seizing the bridge and detaining the 22 sailors of the crew in the steering room and an engine room. They then forced the ship to sea and demanded a ransom of USD$15,000.

Revolt 
The following day, responding to the vessel's distress signal, the American destroyer  approached the ship and deployed an SH-60B helicopter and a VBSS (Visit, Board, Search, and Seizure) team to secure the scene. Meanwhile, the North Korean sailors attacked their captors, seizing some weapons. A prolonged gunfight between the sailors and the pirates resulted in the pirates' defeat.

Two pirates were killed in the engagement, and the others were captured (three were wounded). Of the six Korean sailors wounded, three required medical treatment, which was provided by American medical personnel.

Aftermath 
The North Korean press (KCNA) released an unprecedented positive statement, expressing gratitude to the United States for their help, and emphasizing the successful US–North Korean collaboration during the incident.

References 

2007 in North Korea
Conflicts in 2007
2007 in Somalia
Military history of North Korea
Naval battles involving pirates
Naval battles involving North Korea
North Korea–United States relations
Piracy in Somalia
2007 crimes in Somalia